Arthur Mills (20 February 1816 – 12 October 1898) was a British Conservative Party Member of Parliament (MP).  In his career, he was also a barrister, magistrate, and author in Cornwall and London.  His travels to the 19th century British colonies and his studies of their finances and systems of governance made him an expert in the field.

Family
Mills was born in Barford, Warwickshire in 1816. He was the first surviving son (the second son born) of Revd Francis Mills and Lady Catherine Mordaunt.  He was educated at Rugby School under Dr. Thomas Arnold.  He attended Balliol College in 1835  and earned an M.A. from Oxford in 1838.

Arthur Mills married Lady Agnes Lucy Dyke Acland, daughter of Sir Thomas Dyke Acland, 10th Baronet of Killerton, Devon, and Lydia Elizabeth Hoare on 3 August 1848.  They had two sons, Revd Barton R. V. Mills and Col. Dudley Acland Mills of the Corps of Royal Engineers.

Grandchildren of Arthur Mills included children's book author and schoolmaster George Mills, crime and adventure novelist Arthur F. H. Mills, and Arthur Hobart Mills' wife, Lady Dorothy Mills, the renowned novelist, explorer, and travel writer.
From 1873 to 1885 Mills was a member of the London School Board representing Marylebone.

Career 
Mills became a barrister when he was called to the bar at the Inner Temple, London, in 1842.  He joined the Canterbury Association on 25 October 1849.  He was an MP for Taunton (1852–1853 and 1857–1865) and Exeter (1873–1880).

Notable publications
Two of his publications, India in 1858 [1858] and Systematic Colonisations (now spelled 'Colonizations') [1848] are still in print, the former still being the definitive work on the costs and conditions of the Indian Rebellion of 1857.  The manuscript for India in 1858 was proofed by his friend John Stuart Mill.

Death
He died on 12 October 1898 at Efford Down, Budehaven, Cornwall.

References

External links 

Who Is George Mills?

1816 births
1898 deaths
Conservative Party (UK) MPs for English constituencies
UK MPs 1852–1857
UK MPs 1857–1859
UK MPs 1859–1865
UK MPs 1868–1874
UK MPs 1874–1880
People educated at Rugby School
Alumni of Balliol College, Oxford
Members of the Inner Temple
Members of the London School Board
Members of the Canterbury Association
Members of the Parliament of the United Kingdom for Exeter